Patimat Bagomedova (born August 6, 1993) is an Azerbaijani wrestler who participated at the 2010 Summer Youth Olympics in Singapore. She won the gold medal in the girls' freestyle 52 kg event, defeating Yuan Yuan of China in the final.

References 

Living people
1993 births
Azerbaijani female sport wrestlers
Wrestlers at the 2010 Summer Youth Olympics
World Wrestling Championships medalists
Universiade medalists in wrestling
Universiade silver medalists for Azerbaijan
Youth Olympic gold medalists for Azerbaijan
Medalists at the 2013 Summer Universiade
21st-century Azerbaijani women